Nicolás Aníbal di Biase (born 9 December 1988) is an Argentine professional footballer who plays as a midfielder.

Career
After one year at Al-Yarmouk SC in Kuwait, di Biase joined another Kuwaiti club, Khaitan SC. He returned again to Al-Yarmouk and contributed to the club's arrival in the Premier League.

References

External links
 
 FC Edmonton Profile

1988 births
Living people
Argentine footballers
Argentine expatriate footballers
UP Langreo footballers
A.S.D. Castel di Sangro Calcio players
CD Puertollano footballers
Zamora CF footballers
UB Conquense footballers
Lucena CF players
Club Blooming players
San Telmo footballers
FC Edmonton players
Segunda División B players
North American Soccer League players
Bolivian Primera División players
Kuwait Premier League players
Association football midfielders
Argentine expatriate sportspeople in Spain
Argentine expatriate sportspeople in Italy
Argentine expatriate sportspeople in Canada
Expatriate footballers in Spain
Expatriate footballers in Italy
Expatriate soccer players in Canada
Expatriate footballers in Kuwait
Al-Yarmouk SC (Kuwait) players
Khaitan SC players
Argentine expatriate sportspeople in Kuwait
Expatriate footballers in Bolivia
Argentine expatriate sportspeople in Bolivia
Footballers from Buenos Aires